Saint Isidore of Alexandria was an early Christian saint. According to Alban Butler,

Notes

Sources

4th-century Christian saints
403 deaths